Dovrat is a kibbutz in northern Israel. Located near Afula, it falls under the jurisdiction of Jezreel Valley Regional Council.

History

Kibbutz Dovrat was established on 30 October 1946 by members of the Zra'im group, mostly immigrants from Austria and Germany who arrived before the start of World War II. In 1942, the group assembled in Ein Harod to prepare for the establishment of a new kibbutz. The kibbutz was named after the Levite city of Daberath, located in the territory of the Tribe of Issachar (Joshua 21:28).

In 1947,  the Jewish National Fund purchased land nearby. During the 1948 Arab-Israeli War the kibbutz was moved to the new site, initially known as Dovrat Illit (Upper Dovrat).

Photographs of construction

See also

Noam Dovrat (born 2002), Israeli basketball player

References

External links
Kibbutz website 

Kibbutzim
Kibbutz Movement
Populated places established in 1946
Populated places in Northern District (Israel)
1946 establishments in Mandatory Palestine
Austrian-Jewish culture in Israel
German-Jewish culture in Israel